José Luis Astigarraga Lizarralde C.P. (May 4, 1940 – January 20, 2017) was a Roman Catholic bishop.

Ordained to the priesthood in 1964, Astigarraga Lizarralde served as bishop of the Apostolic Vicarate of Yurimaguas, Peru, from 1992 until 2016.

See also
Catholic Church in Peru

Notes

1940 births
2017 deaths
21st-century Roman Catholic bishops in Peru
20th-century Roman Catholic bishops in Peru
Roman Catholic bishops of Yurimaguas
Passionist bishops